Henriksson is a Swedish patronymic surname meaning "son of Henrik". There are other spelling variations of this surname such as Henrikson, Henricson and Hendrickson.

Geographical distribution
As of 2014, 81.5% of all known bearers of the surname Henriksson were residents of Sweden, 14.1% of Finland and 1.2% of Norway.

In Sweden the frequency of the surname was higher than national average in the following counties:
 1. Norrbotten (1:184)
 2. Värmland (1:298)
 3. Jämtland (1:310)
 4. Västernorrland (1:377)
 5. Blekinge (1:403)
 6. Halland (1:479)
 7. Örebro (1:496)
 8. Kronoberg (1:498)
 9. Kalmar (1:520)
 10. Västra Götaland (1:566)

In Finland, the frequency of the surname was higher than national average in the following regions:
 1. Åland (1:149)
 2. Southwest Finland (1:748)
 3. Uusimaa (1:1,167)
 4. Ostrobothnia (1:1,609)

People
Notable people with the surname include:
 Alf Henrikson (1905–1995), Swedish journalist, writer and poet
 C. Robert Henrikson (born 1947), American CEO of MetLife, Inc
 Daniel Henriksson (born 1978), Swedish ice hockey goaltender
 Krister Henriksson (born 1946), Swedish actor
 Leif Henriksson (born 1943), Swedish ice hockey player
 Martin Henriksson (born 1974), Swedish guitarist
 Robert Hendrickson, American director
 Robert C. Hendrickson (1898–1964), American Senator from New Jersey
 Sebastian Henriksson (born 1974), Swedish football player
 Stig Henriksson (born 1955), Swedish politician
 Sture Henriksson (1917–1957), Swedish politician
 Tord Henriksson (born 1965), Swedish triple jumper
 Waino Edward Hendrickson (1896–1983), American politician

See also
Henricksen

References

Surnames
Swedish-language surnames
Patronymic surnames
Surnames from given names